
Goose Island may refer to:

Places

Australia 
 Goose Island (South Australia), a small rocky island lying off Wardang Island, west of the Yorke Peninsula
Goose Island Conservation Park, a protected area
Goose Island Aquatic Reserve, a marine protected area
 Goose Island (Tasmania), part of the Badger Group of the Furneaux Islands
 Little Goose Island
 Inner Little Goose Island
 Two islands in Western Australia
Goose Island, off the Nornalup Inlet

United States

New York State
 Goose Island (Bronx, NY), an island in the Hutchinson River in the New York City borough of the Bronx, part of Pelham Bay Park
 Goose Island (Long Island Sound), a small, private island and part of the city of New Rochelle, New York
 Goose Island, New York, a community in Washington County

Other states
 Goose Island (Chicago), Illinois
 Goose Island (Connecticut), an island in the Housatonic River in Stratford
 Goose Island (District of Columbia), a vanishing island located in the Potomac River
 Goose Island (Guilford), an uninhabited island in Long Island Sound, off of the coast of Connecticut
 Goose Island (Michigan), an island in Lake Huron
 Goose Island (Montana), an island in Flathead Lake
 Goose Island (San Juan Islands), Washington
 Goose Island State Park, state park near Rockport, Texas

Organizations
 Goose Island Brewery, an American beverage company